Ragna Biskopstø Patawary (née Andreasen; born 10 November 1980) is a Faroese footballer who plays as a defender for Klaksvíkar Ítróttarfelag. She has been a member of the Faroe Islands women's national team. She is the twin sister of fellow Faroese international footballer Rannvá Andreasen and aunt of Faroese international footballer Jákup Andreasen.

References

1980 births
Living people
Women's association football defenders
Faroese women's footballers
People from Klaksvík
Faroe Islands women's international footballers
Faroese twins
Twin sportspeople